Ashok Dhawan is a member of the Uttar Pradesh Legislative Council. In the elections on 23 March 2018, BJP won 11 out of 13 seats and the remaining two were won by Samajwadi Party and Bahujan Samaj Party each.

References

Members of the Uttar Pradesh Legislative Council
Living people
1947 births
Bharatiya Janata Party politicians from Uttar Pradesh